Howard Murphy may refer to:

 Howard Murphy (baseball) (1882–1926), Major League Baseball outfielder
 Howard Murphy (American football), American football coach in the United States